Robert Rutledge (June 3, 1948 – October 15, 2001) was an American sound editor who won Best Sound Editing at the 1985 Academy Awards. He won for Back to the Future, which was shared with Charles L. Campbell.

He also did the sound on the TV show Miami Vice.

Selected filmography
Breakdown (1997)
Extreme Justice (1993)
Out for Justice (1991)
Jetsons: The Movie (1990)
Tango & Cash (1989)
Masters of the Universe (1987)
Poltergeist II: The Other Side (1986)
Back to the Future (1985)
Cat's Eye (1985)
Police Academy (1984)
Spacehunter: Adventures in the Forbidden Zone (1983)
History of the World: Part I (1981)
Wolfen (1981)
The Empire Strikes Back (1980)
Scavenger Hunt (1979)
Yogi's Space Race (1979)
Star Wars (1977)
One Flew Over the Cuckoo's Nest (1975)

References

External links

1948 births
2001 deaths
Best Sound BAFTA Award winners
Best Sound Editing Academy Award winners
American sound editors
People from Los Angeles